Abdul Rahman bin Abdulaziz Al Saud (ʿAbd ar Raḥman ibn ʿAbd al ʿAzīz Āl Suʿūd; 1931 – 13 July 2017) was a senior member of the House of Saud and Saudi Arabian deputy minister of defense and aviation. At the time of his death, he was the oldest living member of the Sudairi Seven.

Early life and education
Abdul Rahman was born in 1931 as the sixteenth son of King Abdulaziz and third son of Hussa bint Ahmed Al Sudairi. He was the first of King Abdulaziz's sons to study in the West and received a bachelor's degree in economics and business administration from the University of California, Berkeley. He also graduated from the California Military Academy.

Career
Prince Abdul Rahman was the counsellor for royal family affairs during the mid-1970s. He replaced his brother, Prince Turki, as the deputy minister of defense and aviation in 1978 when Turki resigned. Prince Abdul Rahman also involved in business activities. In the 1980s, when he was deputy minister, Abdul Rahman reportedly provided food service to the ministry with his own company.

During Prince Sultan’s absence from the Kingdom for medical treatment, he increased his activity at the ministry. Abdul Rahman was often described as becoming more irritable with age.

He was relieved from his post as deputy minister on 5 November 2011. According to Al-Quds Al-Arabi, he was dismissed by King Abdullah when, unhappy at being bypassed as crown prince in favor of Prince Nayef, he refused to declare allegiance to Nayef.

Views and succession
Following the Gulf War Prince Abdul Rahman as deputy defense minister objected to the request of Prince Khalid bin Sultan to be named as the chief of staff of the Saudi army.

Prince Abdul Rahman was reportedly the only son of King Abdulaziz to oppose the 2007 formation of the Allegiance Council, despite support from nearly all sons of the king. The apparent reason for his protests was the fact that he was next in age, after Crown Prince Sultan; the new succession arrangement is based on merit, rather than age. Prince Salman, his younger brother and the referee in family disputes, reportedly met with Abdul Rahman and told him to "shut up and get back to work".

Personal life and death
Prince Abdul Rahman married Maha Al Ibrahim, sister of King Fahd's wife Al Jawhara Al Ibrahim and Al Ibrahim's brothers (including Waleed Al Ibrahim). His another wife was Munira bint Turki bin Ahmed Al Sudairi. His son-in-law is Nayef bin Fawwaz Al Sha'lan. One of Abdul Rahman's son, Mohammed, was named the deputy governor of Riyadh in 2017.

Abdul Rahman died on 13 July 2017 at the age of 86. Funeral prayers were performed at the Grand Mosque in Mecca on 15 July, and he was buried at Al Adl cemetery. One of his sons, Saud, died in November 2021, just a few years after Abdul Rahman.

Ancestry

References

Abdul Rahman
Abdul Rahman
1931 births
2017 deaths
Abdul Rahman
Abdul Rahman
University of California, Berkeley alumni